Notts+Derby is a bus operator providing services in Nottinghamshire and Derbyshire. It is a subsidiary of the Wellglade Group.

Services
Notts+Derby operate a number of contracted bus services around Nottinghamshire and Derbyshire. One of their largest contracts is with the University of Derby for services linking students with campuses and other key locations in Derby.

Notts+Derby also operate Derby College shuttle buses between their 3 main campuses.

As of July 2022, Notts+Derby operate the following commercial bus services:

University of Derby UniBus services are provided by Notts+Derby

Fleet
As of November 2021, the fleet consists of 94 vehicles, the fleet consists of: Optare Solos, Wright Solars, Plaxton Centros, as well as ex-Nottingham City Transport Scania Omnidekkas, ADL Enviro 400s and Wright Eclipse Geminis. from other operators within the Wellglade Group.

Notts+Derby are due their first new buses in the summer of 2022, two Enviro 200MMCs and two  ADL Enviro 400s will join the fleet for the UniBus services, One of the Scania Omnidekka's in the fleet was destroyed after catching fire on 11 July 2022  Also operated for Derby Community Transport services are a small number of Fiat Ducato & Mercedes-Benz Sprinter minibuses

References

External links
Company website

Bus operators in Derbyshire
Bus operators in Nottinghamshire
Transport in Nottingham
Companies based in Derby
Transport in Derby